The Wild Dogs  is a Canadian drama film, directed by Thom Fitzgerald and released in 2002. Set in Romania, the film is an examination of the moral and ethical compromises that people can be forced into when living in poverty.

The film debuted at the 2002 Toronto International Film Festival.

Plot
Fitzgerald acts in the film as Geordie, a pornographer sent to Romania by his boss Colin (Geraint Wyn Davies) to scout for young girls for the company. On the flight he meets Victor (David Hayman), a Canadian diplomat based in Romania who has just been diagnosed with cancer and needs Geordie's help when they arrive in Bucharest, where he in turn meets Victor's wife Natalie (Alberta Watson) and daughter Moll (Rachel Blanchard). As he is actually exposed to conditions in the city, however, Geordie's perspective on his job changes; instead of photographing young women for sexual exploitation, he starts photographing people and conditions around the city in a documentary-like manner.

Cast
Rachel Blanchard as Moll
Visinel Burcea as Sour Grapes
Mihai Calota as Bogdan
Geraint Wyn Davies as Colin
Nelu Dinu as Dorutu (as Dinu Viorel Nelu)
Thom Fitzgerald as Geordie
David Hayman as Victor
Simona Popescu as Varvara
Marcel Unguriano as Radu
Alberta Watson as Natalie

Awards
The film won four awards at the 2002 Atlantic Film Festival, for Best Canadian Film, Best Director (Fitzgerald), Best Sound Design (Hayward Parrott) and Best Editing (Michael Weir). It received three Genie Award nominations at the 24th Genie Awards in 2004, for Best Supporting Actor (Hayman), Best Editing (Weir) and Best Original Score (Sandy Moore).

Fitzgerald picked up an "Emerging Master" trophy from the Seattle International Film Festival.

References

External links 
 

2002 films
English-language Canadian films
Canadian drama films
Films directed by Thom Fitzgerald
Films set in Romania
Films shot in Romania
2000s English-language films
2000s Canadian films